Werauhia is a genus of the botanical family Bromeliaceae, subfamily Tillandsioideae. The genus is named for Werner Rauh, a German botanist (1913–2000). Based on molecular evidence, a number of species previously classified within other bromeliad genera, especially Vriesea and Tillandsia, have been placed in Werauhia instead.

Species

 Werauhia acuminata (Mez & Wercklé) J.R. Grant 
 Werauhia ampla (L.B. Smith) J.R. Grant 
 Werauhia anitana J.F. Morales 
 Werauhia apiculata (L.B. Smith) J.R. Grant 
 Werauhia attenuata (L.B. Smith & Pittendrigh) J.R. Grant 
 Werauhia balanophora (Mez) J.R. Grant 
 Werauhia barii (J.F. Morales) J.F. Morales 
 Werauhia bicolor (L.B. Smith) J.R. Grant 
 Werauhia boliviana H. Luther 
 Werauhia bracteosa (Mez & Wercklé) J.R. Grant 
 Werauhia broadwayi (L.B. Smith) J.R. Grant 
 Werauhia brunei (Mez & Wercklé) J.R. Grant 
 Werauhia burgeri (L.B. Smith) J.R. Grant 
 Werauhia camptoclada (Mez & Wercklé) J.F. Morales 
 Werauhia capitata (Mez & Wercklé) J.R. Grant 
 Werauhia comata (Mez & Wercklé) J.R. Grant 
 Werauhia cowellii (Mez & N.L. Britton) J.R. Grant 
 Werauhia dalstroemii H. Luther 
 Werauhia diantha (H. Luther) J.R. Grant 
 Werauhia dressleri (Rauh) J.R. Grant 
 Werauhia gibba (L.B. Smith) J.R. Grant 
 Werauhia gigantea (Martius ex Schultes f.) J.R. Grant 
 Werauhia gladioliflora (H. Wendland) J.R. Grant 
 Werauhia graminifolia (Mez & Wercklé) J.R. Grant 
 Werauhia greenbergii (J. Utley) J.R. Grant 
 Werauhia guadelupensis (Baker) J.R. Grant 
 Werauhia haberi (J.F. Morales) J.F. Morales 
 Werauhia hainesiorum (L.B. Smith) J.R. Grant 
 Werauhia haltonii (H. Luther) J.R. Grant 
 Werauhia haplostachya (C. Wright ex Sauvalle) J.R. Grant 
 Werauhia hygrometrica (André) J.R. Grant 
 Werauhia insignis (Mez) W. Till, Barfuss & R. Samuel 
 Werauhia jenii S. Pierce 
 Werauhia kathyae (J. Utley) J.R. Grant 
 Werauhia kupperiana (Suessenguth) J.R. Grant 
 Werauhia latissima (Mez & Wercklé) J.R. Grant 
 Werauhia laxa (Mez & Wercklé) J.R. Grant 
 Werauhia leucophylla (L.B. Smith) J.R. Grant 
 Werauhia luis-gomezii (J. Utley) J.R. Grant 
 Werauhia lutheri S. Pierce & J.E. Aranda 
 Werauhia lyman-smithii (J. Utley) J.R. Grant 
 Werauhia macrantha (Mez & Wercklé) J.R. Grant 
 Werauhia macrochlamys (Mez & Wercklé) J.F. Morales 
 Werauhia marnier-lapostollei (L.B. Smith) J.R. Grant 
 Werauhia millennia J.R. Grant 
 Werauhia moralesii H. Luther 
 Werauhia nephrolepis (L.B. Smith & Pittendrigh) J.R. Grant 
 Werauhia noctiflorens T. Krömer, Espejo, López-Ferrari & Acebey 
 Werauhia notata (L.B. Smith & Pittendrigh) J.R. Grant 
 Werauhia nutans (L.B. Smith) J.R. Grant 
 Werauhia ochracea (Rauh & E. Gross) J.R. Grant 
 Werauhia orjuelae (L.B. Smith) J.R. Grant 
 Werauhia ororiensis (Mez) J.R. Grant 
 Werauhia osaensis (J.F. Morales) J.F. Morales 
 Werauhia panamaensis (E. Gross & Rauh) J.R. Grant 
 Werauhia paniculata (Mez & Wercklé) J.R. Grant 
 Werauhia paupera (Mez & Sodiro) J.R. Grant 
 Werauhia pectinata (L.B. Smith) J.R. Grant 
 Werauhia pedicellata (Mez & Wercklé) J.R. Grant 
 Werauhia picta (Mez & Wercklé) J.R. Grant 
 Werauhia pittieri (Mez) J.R. Grant 
 Werauhia proctorii Cedeño-Maldonado 
 Werauhia pycnantha (L.B. Smith) J.R. Grant 
 Werauhia ringens (Grisebach) J.R. Grant 
 Werauhia rubra (Mez & Wercklé) J.R. Grant 
 Werauhia rugosa (Mez & Wercklé) J.R. Grant 
 Werauhia sanguinolenta (Linden ex Cogniaux & Marchal) J.R. Grant 
 Werauhia singuliflora (Mez & Wercklé) J.R. Grant 
 Werauhia sintenisii (Baker) J.R. Grant 
 Werauhia stenophylla (Mez & Wercklé) J.R. Grant 
 Werauhia subsecunda (Wittmack) J.R. Grant 
 Werauhia tarmaensis (Rauh) J.R. Grant 
 Werauhia tiquirensis (J.F. Morales) J.F. Morales 
 Werauhia tonduziana (L.B. Smith) J.R. Grant 
 Werauhia umbrosa (L.B. Smith) J.R. Grant 
 Werauhia urbaniana (Mez) J.R. Grant 
 Werauhia uxoris (Utley) J.R. Grant 
 Werauhia van-hyningii (L.B. Smith) J.R. Grant 
 Werauhia verrucosa (L.B. Smith) J.R. Grant 
 Werauhia vietoris (J. Utley) J.R. Grant 
 Werauhia viridiflora (Regel) J.R. Grant 
 Werauhia viridis (Mez & Wercklé) J.R. Grant 
 Werauhia vittata (Mez & Wercklé) J.R. Grant 
 Werauhia vulcanicola (J.F. Morales) J.F. Morales 
 Werauhia werckleana (Mez) J.R. Grant 
 Werauhia williamsii (L.B. Smith) J.R. Grant 
 Werauhia woodsoniana (L.B. Smith) J.R. Grant

References

External links
 Werauhia photos at the Florida Council of Bromeliad Societies website
BSI Genera Gallery Werauhia photos

 
Epiphytes
Bromeliaceae genera